Scriabin's Piano Sonata No. 2 in G-sharp minor, (Op. 19, also titled Sonata-Fantasy) took five years for him to write. It was finally published in 1898, at the urging of his publisher.  The piece is in two movements, with a style combining Chopin-like Romanticism with an impressionistic touch. The piece is widely appreciated and is one of Scriabin's most popular pieces.

The first movement Andante, in sonata form, begins with echoing effects, followed by two lyrically themed sections. The first theme is in G-Sharp minor, but the following two come in B major (the relative major). After a short climax in the development, the piece modulates to E major (also C-sharp minor) for the recapitulation and lyrical sections are restated with a slightly more complicated accompaniment. The second movement Presto, in sharp contrast to the first movement, is very fast and intense. Alternating crescendos and decrescendos may give the listener the impression of waves.

The precedent of Beethoven's "Moonlight" Sonata allowed Scriabin the luxury of an opening slow movement to his Second Sonata, whose programme reads thus: 
"The first section represents the quiet of a southern night on the seashore; the development is the dark agitation of the deep, deep sea. The E major middle section shows caressing moonlight coming up after the first darkness of night. The second movement represents the vast expanse of ocean in stormy agitation."

Typical of Scriabin's piano sonatas, it is technically and musically demanding for the pianist. A typical performance lasts about 11 minutes.

References

External links

Recordings
Scriabin's Piano Sonata No. 2 in G-sharp minor, Op. 19 played by Maria Perrotta

Piano Sonata 02
1897 compositions
Compositions in G-sharp minor